The 14th South American Junior Championships in Athletics were held in Rio de Janeiro, Brazil from October 15–18, 1981.

Participation (unofficial)

Detailed result lists can be found on the "World Junior Athletics History" website.  An unofficial count yields the number of about 189 athletes from about 9 countries:  Argentina (42), Brazil (50), Chile (37), Colombia (12), Ecuador (1), Paraguay (6), Peru (2), Uruguay (10), Venezuela
(29).

Medal summary
Medal winners are published for men and women
Complete results can be found on the "World Junior Athletics History" website.

Men

Women

Medal table (unofficial)

References

External links
World Junior Athletics History

South American U20 Championships in Athletics
Athletics
South American U20 Championships
International sports competitions in Rio de Janeiro (city)
International athletics competitions hosted by Brazil
1981 in youth sport
Athletics in Rio de Janeiro (city)